United Nations Security Council resolution 915, adopted unanimously on 4 May 1994, after reaffirming Resolution 910 (1994), the council, acting on a recommendation by the Secretary-General Boutros Boutros-Ghali, established the United Nations Aouzou Strip Observer Group (UNASOG) to supervise the withdrawal of Libyan forces from the Aouzou Strip following an International Court of Justice opinion that the strip formed part of the territory of Chad.

The council noted that an agreement signed in Sirte, Libya, between the two countries provided for a presence of the United Nations to monitor the withdrawal by Libya, while announcing its intention to promote peaceful relations between both parties.

It was decided that UNASOG would be established for a single period of up to forty days, beginning from the adoption of the present resolution. It would consist of nine United Nations observers and six support staff to observe the implementation of the agreement. Co-operation from both parties with the Secretary-General Boutros Boutros-Ghali was urged, and in particular to grant it freedom of movement.

The council also recognised that UNASOG would need to travel to Libya by air and this would require an exemption from international sanctions placed on the country and in particular provisions of Resolution 748 (1992). Acting under Chapter VII of the United Nations Charter, the council decided that the provisions would not apply to the UNASOG mission, requesting the Secretary-General to inform the committee established in Resolution 748 of flights made, and to keep the Council updated on developments.

See also
 Case Concerning the Territorial Dispute (Libya v. Chad)
 Chadian–Libyan conflict
 Foreign relations of Libya
 List of United Nations Security Council Resolutions 901 to 1000 (1994–1995)

References

External links
 
Text of the Resolution at undocs.org

 0915
1994 in Libya
1994 in Chad
Chadian–Libyan War
 0915
 0915
May 1994 events